Davis Plantation may refer to:

Davis-Felton Plantation, Henderson, Georgia, listed on the NRHP in Houston County, Georgia
Archibald H. Davis Plantation, Justice, North Carolina, listed on the NRHP in Franklin County, North Carolina
Davis Plantation (Monticello, South Carolina), listed on the NRHP in Fairfield County, South Carolina